Patrick Côté (born February 29, 1980) is a retired Canadian professional mixed martial artist. A professional from 2002 until 2017, Côté is perhaps best known for his 21-bout career in the UFC, and was a finalist on season four of The Ultimate Fighter.

Background
Côté was born in Rimouski, Québec, Canada, on February 29, 1980. Côté started his martial arts training in the Canadian Army at around age of 16, where he took up boxing and subsequently added muay thai, kickboxing and wrestling to his repertoire. Côté served in the army until 2005, when he started training full-time.  Currently, he studies Brazilian Jiu Jitsu under Fabio Holanda at BTT Canada. Côté also studies Muay Thai with renowned coach Mark DellaGrotte, a former coach on The Ultimate Fighter 4. He also maintains ties with Team Legion.

Mixed martial arts career

Ultimate Fighting Championship
Côté made his UFC debut at UFC 50, on October 22, 2004 against Tito Ortiz. Côté accepted the fight on just four days' notice when Lion's Den veteran Guy Mezger pulled out of the main event due to an injury. He said to Ortiz before the fight that, if he thought Chuck Liddell hit hard, he hit harder. Côté lost via unanimous decision; however, he impressed UFC officials by not being submitted or knocked out by Ortiz and displaying toughness and willingness to take the fight on short notice.

Côté returned to the octagon in 2005 losing his next two fights to Joe Doerksen and Chris Leben. In 2006, Côté was a contestant on The Ultimate Fighter: The Comeback,  defeating Jorge Rivera and Edwin Dewees in exhibition matches. He advanced to the finale, where he lost by first round submission to Brazilian Jiu-Jitsu fighter Travis Lutter at The Ultimate Fighter 4 Finale in a non-exhibition match. This loss brought Côté's official UFC record to 0–4.

Three months later Côté earned his first win in the UFC at UFC 67, defeating TUF4 teammate Scott Smith by unanimous decision. In August 2007, he defeated TUF3 winner Kendall Grove at UFC 74 via TKO in the first round. Côté then fought Drew McFedries at UFC Fight Night, winning in the first round via TKO after catching McFedries with a counter punch. Côté extended his UFC win streak to four fights at UFC 86 by defeating Ricardo Almeida via split decision, also earning him a title shot.

Côté faced UFC Middleweight Champion Anderson Silva on October 25, 2008 at UFC 90, the UFC's first event in Illinois.  Silva won the first 2 rounds but Côté proved how good his chin was by taking a roundhouse kick and flying knee right on the button without getting rocked in the very first round. In the third round, Côté's movement inside the octagon caused too much pressure on the back of his right leg (which he was using to move forward) and an injury caused him to fall to the mat grasping his right knee in pain. Referee Herb Dean declared the fight over when Côté could not continue, ruling the bout a TKO victory for Silva. Côté, however, became the first of Silva's UFC opponents to make it into the third round.

On January 25, 2009, while taking time off for his surgically repaired knee, Patrick said during an interview with MMA Mania that if he gets a rematch with Anderson Silva he is confident that he will beat him. He also indicated in a July 2009 interview with Rogers Sportsnet's MMA Connected television program that he would like to fight Michael Bisping, assuming that Bisping lost to Dan Henderson.

Côté returned from his injury after nearly a year and a half off at UFC 113. In the second round Côté was submitted via rear naked choke by Alan Belcher after being slammed on his head. Côté complained after the loss that he had been illegally spiked onto the canvas, but the referee ruled that Côté had landed on his face, not his head.

Côté faced Tom Lawlor on October 23, 2010 at UFC 121. Out-wrestled by his opponent for all three rounds, Côté lost the fight by unanimous decision with 30–27 scores on all three judges' cards.

After the loss to Lawlor and with a record of 4-7 in the UFC, Côté was released from the promotion.

Independent promotions
On January 18, 2011, Côté confirmed via Twitter that he had signed a contract with Montreal's Ringside MMA promotion to fight at an upcoming card to be held at Montreal's Bell Centre. He faced fellow UFC veteran Kalib Starnes and won the fight via unanimous decision.

On June 4, 2011, Côté faced fellow UFC veteran Todd Brown. The day before, Brown and Côté were in a heated confrontation when Brown shoved Cote during the weigh-ins and Cote slapped Brown across the face afterwards. Côté won the fight by unanimous decision.

On October 7, 2011, Côté faced muay thai specialist Crafton Wallace at Instinct MMA 1 in Boisbriand, Quebec, Canada. Côté won the fight via TKO after Wallace injured his leg by stuffing a takedown.

Côté next fought on March 31, 2012 at AFC 2 against Gracie trained BJJ black belt Gustavo Machado in Brazil. Côté won via KO in the first round.

Return to UFC
Côté returned to the UFC stepping in as a replacement for Rich Franklin against Cung Le on July 7, 2012 at UFC 148. Côté was defeated via unanimous decision.

Côté next fought Alessio Sakara on November 17, 2012 at UFC 154. He won the fight via disqualification after being punched in the back of the head multiple times.

A rematch was briefly linked with Sakara for March 16, 2013 at UFC 158.  However, Sakara was forced out of the bout with a kidney illness.

On December 18, 2012, it was announced that Côté was dropping down to the welterweight division.  Côté faced promotional newcomer Bobby Voelker on March 16, 2013 at UFC 158. He was successful in his welterweight debut, winning the back-and-forth fight via unanimous decision.

On June 14, 2013, it was announced that Côté would be coaching The Ultimate Fighter Nations: Canada vs. Australia, opposite Kyle Noke. The reality show features welterweights and middleweights. The coaches faced each other on April 16, 2014 at The Ultimate Fighter Nations Finale. Côté won the fight by unanimous decision.

Côté faced Stephen Thompson on September 27, 2014 at UFC 178. He lost the fight via unanimous decision.

Côté faced Joe Riggs at UFC 186 on April 25, 2015. He won the back-and-forth fight by unanimous decision.

Côté faced Josh Burkman on August 23, 2015 at UFC Fight Night 74. He won the back and forth fight via TKO in the third round and both participants were awarded Fight of the Night honors. Côté became the first person to beat Burkman by TKO.

Côté faced Ben Saunders on January 17, 2016 at UFC Fight Night 81. He won the fight via TKO in the second round.

Côté next faced Donald Cerrone on June 18, 2016 at UFC Fight Night 89. He lost the fight via TKO in the third round.

Côté faced Thiago Alves on April 8, 2017 at UFC 210. He lost the fight via unanimous decision and subsequently announced his retirement from the sport.

Championships and accomplishments
Maximum Fighting Championship
MFC Middleweight Championship (One time)
Ultimate Fighting Championship
Fight of the Night (One Time) vs. Josh Burkman
Knockout of the Night (Two times) vs. Kendall Grove and Drew McFedries
The Ultimate Fighter 4 (Finalist)
MMAJunkie.com
2015 August Fight of the Month vs. Josh Burkman

Mixed martial arts record

|-
|Loss
|align=center|23–11
|Thiago Alves
|Decision (unanimous)
|UFC 210
|
|align=center|3
|align=center|5:00
|Buffalo, New York, United States
| 
|-
|Loss
|align=center|23–10
|Donald Cerrone
|TKO (punches)
|UFC Fight Night: MacDonald vs. Thompson
|
|align=center|3
|align=center|2:35
|Ottawa, Ontario, Canada
|
|-
|Win
|align=center|23–9
|Ben Saunders
|TKO (punches)
|UFC Fight Night: Dillashaw vs. Cruz
|
|align=center|2
|align=center|1:14
|Boston, Massachusetts, United States
|     
|-
|Win
|align=center|22–9 
|Josh Burkman
|TKO (punches)
|UFC Fight Night: Holloway vs. Oliveira
|
|align=center|3
|align=center|1:26
|Saskatoon, Saskatchewan, Canada
|
|-
|Win
|align=center| 21–9 
|Joe Riggs
|Decision (unanimous)
|UFC 186
|
|align=center|3
|align=center|5:00
|Montreal, Quebec, Canada
|
|-
| Loss
| align=center| 20–9 
| Stephen Thompson
| Decision (unanimous)
| UFC 178
| 
| align=center| 3
| align=center| 5:00
| Las Vegas, Nevada, United States
| 
|-
| Win
| align=center| 20–8 
| Kyle Noke
| Decision (unanimous)
| The Ultimate Fighter Nations Finale: Bisping vs. Kennedy
| 
| align=center| 3 
| align=center| 5:00 
| Quebec City, Quebec, Canada
| 
|-
| Win
| align=center| 19–8
| Bobby Voelker
| Decision (unanimous)
| UFC 158
| 
| align=center| 3
| align=center| 5:00
| Montreal, Quebec, Canada
| 
|-
| Win
| align=center| 18–8
| Alessio Sakara
| DQ (punches to back of head)
| UFC 154
| 
| align=center| 1
| align=center| 1:26
| Montreal, Quebec, Canada
| 
|-
| Loss
| align=center| 17–8
| Cung Le
| Decision (unanimous)
| UFC 148
| 
| align=center| 3
| align=center| 5:00
| Las Vegas, Nevada, United States
| 
|-
| Win
| align=center| 17–7
| Gustavo Machado
| KO (punches) 
| Amazon Forest Combat 2
| 
| align=center| 1
| align=center| 2:44
| Manaus, Brazil
| 
|-
| Win
| align=center| 16–7
| Crafton Wallace
| TKO (knee injury) 
| Instinct MMA 1
| 
| align=center| 1
| align=center| 1:36
| Boisbriand, Quebec, Canada
| 
|-
| Win
| align=center| 15–7
| Todd Brown
| Decision (unanimous)
| Ringside MMA 11
| 
| align=center| 3
| align=center| 5:00
| Quebec City, Quebec, Canada
| 
|-
| Win
| align=center| 14–7
| Kalib Starnes
| Decision (unanimous)
| Ringside MMA 10
| 
| align=center| 3
| align=center| 5:00
| Montreal, Quebec, Canada
| 
|-
| Loss
| align=center| 13–7
| Tom Lawlor
| Decision (unanimous)
| UFC 121
| 
| align=center| 3
| align=center| 5:00
| Anaheim, California, United States
| 
|-
| Loss
| align=center| 13–6
| Alan Belcher
| Submission (rear-naked choke)
| UFC 113
| 
| align=center| 2
| align=center| 3:25
| Montreal, Quebec, Canada
| 
|-
| Loss
| align=center| 13–5
| Anderson Silva
| TKO (knee injury)
| UFC 90
| 
| align=center| 3
| align=center| 0:39
| Rosemont, Illinois, United States
| 
|-
| Win
| align=center| 13–4
| Ricardo Almeida
| Decision (split)
| UFC 86
| 
| align=center| 3
| align=center| 5:00
| Las Vegas, Nevada, United States
| 
|-
| Win
| align=center| 12–4
| Drew McFedries
| TKO (punches)
| UFC Fight Night: Swick vs. Burkman
| 
| align=center| 1
| align=center| 1:44
| Las Vegas, Nevada, United States
| 
|-
| Win
| align=center| 11–4
| Kendall Grove
| TKO (punches)
| UFC 74
| 
| align=center| 1
| align=center| 4:45
| Las Vegas, Nevada, United States
| 
|-
| Win
| align=center| 10–4
| Jason Day
| TKO (punches)
| TKO 29
| 
| align=center| 1
| align=center| 4:05
| Montreal, Quebec, Canada
| 
|-
| Win
| align=center| 9–4
| Scott Smith
| Decision (unanimous)
| UFC 67
| 
| align=center| 3
| align=center| 5:00
| Las Vegas, Nevada, United States
| 
|-
| Loss
| align=center| 8–4
| Travis Lutter
| Submission (armbar)
| The Ultimate Fighter: The Comeback Finale
| 
| align=center| 1
| align=center| 2:18
| Las Vegas, Nevada, United States
| 
|-
| Win
| align=center| 8–3
| Jason MacDonald
| Submission (rear-naked choke)
| MFC 9: No Excuses
| 
| align=center| 5
| align=center| 3:35
| Edmonton, Alberta, Canada
| 
|-
| Win
| align=center| 7–3
| Bill Mahood
| Submission (guillotine choke)
| KOTC  
| 
| align=center| 2
| align=center| 2:42
| Prince George, British Columbia, Canada
| 
|-
| Loss
| align=center| 6–3
| Chris Leben
| Decision (split)
| UFC Ultimate Fight Night
| 
| align=center| 3
| align=center| 5:00
| Las Vegas, Nevada, United States
| 
|-
| Loss
| align=center| 6–2
| Joe Doerksen
| Submission (rear-naked choke)
| UFC 52
| 
| align=center| 3
| align=center| 2:35
| Las Vegas, Nevada, United States
| 
|-
| Win
| align=center| 6–1
| Ricardeau Francois
| Decision (split)
| TKO 19
| 
| align=center| 3
| align=center| 5:00
| Montreal, Quebec, Canada
| 
|-
| Loss
| align=center| 5–1
| Tito Ortiz
| Decision (unanimous)
| UFC 50
| 
| align=center| 3
| align=center| 5:00
| Atlantic City, New Jersey, United States
| 
|-
| Win
| align=center| 5–0
| Bill Mahood
| KO (punch)
| TKO 16
| 
| align=center| 1
| align=center| 0:21
| Quebec City, Quebec, Canada
| 
|-
| Win
| align=center| 4–0
| Steve Vigneault
| KO (punch)
| TKO 14
| 
| align=center| 1
| align=center| 1:08
| Victoriaville, Quebec, Canada
| 
|-
| Win
| align=center| 3–0
| Yan Pellerin
| Decision (unanimous)
| TKO 13
| 
| align=center| 3
| align=center| 5:00
| Montreal, Quebec, Canada
| 
|-
| Win
| align=center| 2–0
| Glenn Murdoch
| TKO (punches)
| UCC Proving Ground 9
| 
| align=center| 1
| align=center| 5:00
| Victoriaville, Quebec, Canada
| 
|-
| Win
| align=center| 1–0
| Pascal Gosselin
| Submission (rear-naked choke)
| UCC Proving Ground 8
| 
| align=center| 1
| align=center| 1:18
| Victoriaville, Quebec, Canada
|

Exhibition record

| Win
| align=center| 2–0
| Edwin Dewees
| Decision (unanimous)
| The Ultimate Fighter 4
|  (airdate)
| align=center| 3
| align=center| 5:00
| Las Vegas, Nevada, United States
| 
|-
| Win
| align=center| 1–0
| Jorge Rivera
| Decision (unanimous)
| The Ultimate Fighter 4
|  (airdate)
| align=center| 2
| align=center| 5:00
| Las Vegas, Nevada, United States
|

Professional boxing record

{|class="wikitable" style="text-align:center; font-size:95%"
|-
!
!Result
!Record
!Opponent
!Method
!Round, time
!Date
!Location
!Notes
|-
|1
|Loss
|0–1
|style="text-align:left;"| Stephane Tessier
|
|4
|October 1, 2005
|align=left| 
|

See also
 List of male mixed martial artists
 List of mixed martial artists with professional boxing records
List of Canadian UFC fighters

References

External links
 
 
 

1980 births
Living people
Canadian Muay Thai practitioners
Canadian practitioners of Brazilian jiu-jitsu
People awarded a black belt in Brazilian jiu-jitsu
Canadian male judoka
Canadian male mixed martial artists
Middleweight mixed martial artists
Mixed martial artists utilizing boxing
Mixed martial artists utilizing Brazilian jiu-jitsu
Mixed martial artists utilizing Muay Thai
Mixed martial artists utilizing judo
Mixed martial artists utilizing wrestling
French Quebecers
People from Rimouski
Sportspeople from Quebec
Ultimate Fighting Championship male fighters